The 2012 CONCACAF Women's U-20 Championship was the sixth edition of the CONCACAF Women's U-20 Championship. The final tournament was hosted by Panama from 1 to 11 March 2012.
All matches were played at the Estadio Rommel Fernández. The top three teams of the 2012 tournament earned qualification to the 2012 FIFA U-20 Women's World Cup. The tournament was won by the United States, who defeated Canada in the final, 2–1. Mexico secured the final qualification position by defeating Panama in the third place match, 5–0.

Qualification

Bold indicates that the corresponding team was hosting the event. 
Note: Panama qualified to the tournament, only later was announced as host.

Venue

Match officials
The match officials were announced the 14 February 2012.

Squads

Group stage
The draw for the tournament took place on the 15 January 2012 in the CONCACAF offices in Miami Beach, Florida. The schedule was announced on the 25 January 2012.
All matches up to 9 March 2012 (group stage and semi-finals) are EST (UTC−05:00). The last two matches (third place match and final) are EDT (UTC−04:00).

Group A

Group B

Knockout rounds 
The winners of the two semifinals and the third place match qualify for the 2012 FIFA U-20 Women's World Cup in Japan.

Semi-finals

Third place match

Final

Awards

Goalscorers
6 goals
 Natalia Gómez Junco

5 goals
 Maya Hayes

4 goals

 Jenna Richardson
 Lindsey Horan

3 goals

 Catherine Charron-Delage
 Nkemjika Ezurike
 Yamile Franco
 Tanya Samarzich
 Julie Johnston
 Katie Stengel

2 goals

 Christabel Oduro
 Rachel Peláez
 Maria Monterroso
 Ariana Martínez
 Daniela Solís
 Vanessa DiBernardo
 Chioma Ubogagu

1 goal

 Vanessa Legault-Cordisco
 Amélia Pietrangelo
 Jaclyn Sawicki
 María Pérez
 Maria Argueta
 Cinthya López
 Idania Pérez
 Kimberly Spence
 Olivia Jiménez
 Chrystal Martínez
 Marta Cox
 Ángela Evans
 Maira Jordan
 Natalia Mills
 Yessenia Zorrilla
 Morgan Brian
 Micaela Capelle
 Samantha Mewis
 Kealia Ohai
 Cari Roccaro

1 own goal
 Odette Bayeux (playing against Guatemala)

See also 

 2012 FIFA U-20 Women's World Cup

References

External links 
 Official CONCACAF website for Women's Under-20s
 Official schedule and results at official CONCACAF website
 CONCACAF U-20 Championship 2012 on WomensSoccerUnited.com
 CONCACAF Under-20 Women 2012 Official Tournament recap report 

 
CONCACAF Women's U-20 Championship
Women's
2012
CON
2012 in youth association football